Tokyo, Oklahoma is the seventh studio album by American country music artist John Anderson, it was released in June 1985. It was re-released on November 12, 2007.

Track listing

Personnel
 Donna Anderson - backing vocals
 Eddie Bayers - drums
 Barry Beckett - keyboards
 Clyde Brooks - drums
 Dennis Burnside - keyboards
 Larry Byrom - guitar
 Fred Carter Jr. - guitar
 Buddy Emmons - steel guitar
 Larry Emmons - bass
 Steve Gibson - guitar
 John Barlow Jarvis - keyboards
 Mike Jordan - keyboards
 Jerry Kroon - drums
 Josh Leo - guitar
 X Lincoln - bass
 Tom Morley - fiddle, mandolin
 Nashville String Machine - strings
 Vern Pilder - guitar
 Bill Puett - saxophone, recorder
 Buck Reid - steel guitar
 Michael Rhodes - bass
 Diane Tidwell - backing vocals
 Bergen White - backing vocals
 Hershel Wiginton - backing vocals
 Jim Wolfe - drums
 Paul Worley - guitar
 John Anderson - vocals, guitar, harmonica

Chart performance

Album

Singles

References

1985 albums
Warner Records albums
John Anderson (musician) albums
Albums produced by Jim Ed Norman